Sychyovka is a town and the administrative center of Sychyovsky District in Smolensk Oblast, Russia, located between the Vazuza and Losmina Rivers,  northeast of Smolensk, the administrative center of the oblast. Population:

Etymology
The name of the town derives from the Russian word "" (sych), which literally means "little owl", but can also mean "a gloomy person".

History
It was first mentioned in 1488 as a votchina of a Tver prince Ivan the Young, son of Ivan III. In 1493, it became a palace village in Vyazminsky Uyezd. In 1776, Sychyovka was granted town status. During World War II, the town was occupied by the German Army from October 10, 1941 until March 8, 1943, when it was liberated by troops of the Soviet Western Front.

On January 7, 1943, Jews of the town were murdered in a mass execution perpetrated by an Einsatzgruppen.

Administrative and municipal status
Within the framework of administrative divisions, Sychyovka serves as the administrative center of Sychyovsky District. As an administrative division, it is incorporated within Sychyovsky District as Sychyovskoye Urban Settlement. As a municipal division, this administrative unit also has urban settlement status and is a part of Sychyovsky Municipal District.

References

Notes

Sources

Cities and towns in Smolensk Oblast
Sychyovsky Uyezd
Holocaust locations in Russia